The Expo 67 International and Universal Exposition featured 90 pavilions representing Man and His World, on a theme derived from Terre des Hommes, written by the famous French pilot Antoine de Saint-Exupéry.

The exposition displayed many nations, corporations, industries, technologies, social themes, religions, and designs, including the US pavilion, a geodesic dome designed by Buckminster Fuller. Expo 67 also featured Habitat 67, an urban modular housing complex designed by architect Moshe Safdie, whose units were purchased by private Montrealers after the fair was concluded and is still occupied today.

The most popular display of the exposition was the soaring Soviet Union pavilion, which attracted about 13 million visitors.  Rounding out the top five pavilions (by attendance) were: Canada (11 million visitors), the United States (9 million), France (8.5 million), and Czechoslovakia (8 million).

The participating countries were:
 Africa: Algeria, Cameroon, Chad, Congo, Ivory Coast, Ethiopia, Gabon, Ghana, Kenya, Madagascar, Morocco, Mauritius, Niger, Rwanda, Senegal, Tanzania, Togo, Tunisia, Uganda, and Upper Volta;
 Asia: Burma, Ceylon, China (Taiwan), Korea, India, Iran, Israel, Japan, Thailand and the United Arab Republic; 
 Australia;
 Europe: Austria, Belgium, Czechoslovakia, Denmark, Finland, France, Federal Republic of Germany, Greece, Iceland, Italy, Monaco, the Netherlands, Norway, Sweden, Switzerland, United Kingdom, the USSR, and Yugoslavia;
 South America & Caribbean: Barbados, Cuba, Grenada, Guyana, Haiti, Jamaica, Trinidad and Tobago, and Venezuela;
 North America: Canada, Mexico, and the United States.

Absent countries included the People's Republic of China, Spain, South Africa (banned from BIE-sanctioned events due to its apartheid policy), and many countries of South America.

National pavilions 
(From the Official Guide of Expo 67)

 Canadian Pavilion - The distinctive building in the form of a large inverted pyramid called the Katimavik, which is the Inuit word for "Gathering Place".  The pavilion was located on a 30,285 sq metre lot and designed by Roderick Robbie, Colin Vaughan, Paul Schoeler and Matt Stankiewicz, with consulting architects Evans St. Gelais and Arthur Erickson.  The major attractions in the building included a rotating cinema.
 Africa Place- Countries represented: Cameroon; Chad; Democratic Republic of Congo; Gabon; Ghana; Ivory Coast; Kenya; Madagascar; Niger; Rwanda; Senegal; Tanzania;Uganda.
 Arab Countries - Countries represented: Algeria; Kuwait; Morocco; United Arab Republic (Egypt).
 Australia - Australia's Pavilion featured a large lounge area with prominent Australian oil paintings and seat-activated audio chairs that gave commentary in either French or English on a variety of Australian topics. There was also a static tropical coral display representing the Great Barrier Reef, and a kangaroo enclosure.
 Belgium
 Britain
 Burma
 Ceylon
 China
 Cuba

 Czechoslovakia - featuring the world's first interactive movie, Kinoautomat, directed by Radúz Činčera, as well as an extensive collection of Bohemian glassware. The main building was dismantled and moved to Grand Falls-Windsor, Newfoundland.
 Ethiopia
 European Community

 France
 Greece
 Guyane - Barbados
 Haiti
 India
 Iran

 Israel by Arieh Sharon
 Italy
 Japan
 Korea
 Mauritius
 Mexico
 Monaco
 Netherlands
 Scandinavia – countries represented: Denmark; Finland; Iceland; Norway; Sweden.
 Switzerland
 Thailand
 Trinidad and Tobago
 Tunisia
 Union of Soviet Socialist Republics Pavilion (USSR) - now stands as the Moscow Pavilion at the All-Russia Exhibition Centre in Moscow.

 United States of America Pavilion - designed by Buckminster Fuller, the pavilion was the third most popular, with over 9 million visits. The building was distinguished by its large 20-story geodesic dome with an acrylic skin (which would catch fire and melt away in 1976). The Expo 67 minirail train passed through the building. Designed by Cambridge Seven Associates, the six levels of exhibits, connected by escalators, were based on the theme of: "Creative America - the positive use of creative energy". The exhibits included everything from American Folk Art and Elvis Presley's guitar to NASA’s Apollo Command Module and Lunar Excursion Module. But not everyone liked the pavilion, including US President Lyndon B. Johnson, who (after a brief visit) was alleged to have said "the homosexuals have had carte blanche!" in reference to the design and content of the displays. After Expo 67, the geodesic dome was repurposed to house the Biosphère.
 Venezuela
 West Germany (FRG) - Designed by Frei Otto, who later worked on the design of the Japanese Pavilion at Expo 2000
 Yugoslavia

Theme pavilions 
(From the Official Guide of Expo 67)

 Man the Explorer - Man and Life; Man his Planet and Space; Man and the Oceans; man and the Polar Regions; Man and his Health.
 Man the Producer - Resources for Man; Man in Control.
 Man the Creator - The Gallery of Fine Arts;  Contemporary Sculpture; Industrial Design; Photography.
 Man in the Community - Seven displays relating Man to the urban life and his interdependence on others.
 Man the Provider - Agriculture.
 Labyrinth - A pavilion of functional architecture designed for the presentation of the multi-screen film In the Labyrinth.
 Habitat 67 - A novel construction project related to Man's housing needs.

Privately-sponsored pavilions 
 Air Canada
 Alcan Aquarium
 Bell Telephone Pavilion, also known as the "Telephone Pavilion". The pavilion's feature attraction was the exciting Walt Disney Imagineering Circle-Vision 360° documentary film Canada '67.  From the Expo '67 Guide Book: "You're on centre stage for the RCMP Musical Ride... on centre ice for hockey... on the track at the Stampede! CIRCLE-VISION 360° surrounds you with all the fun and excitement of Canada's most thrilling events and its scenic beauty. And then, take your children to the Enchanted Forest... see exciting new communication services for the future... all in the Telephone Pavilion!" The pavilion also offered many of the public their first look at AT&T's state-of-the-art videophone called the Picturephone, the product of US$500 Million of research and development.
 Boy Scouts Pavilion
 Brewers Pavilion
 Canadian National Railway Pavilion  
 Canadian Pacific - Cominco Pavilion
 Canadian Pulp and Paper Pavilion - 44 stylized tree tops created the unique roof, the tallest tree reaching 8 stories.  Out front, guests were greeted by a stylized sculpture of a roll of paper being unwound. The sculpture had the attached meaning of: "(paper) the principal tool Man uses to record his thoughts".  The trees were constructed with tongue and groove Douglas fir plywood (19 mm) over a steel frame.  All of the trees had the same 4.9m base, but the height varied from 5 to 18 m.   The plywood was coated with various shades of green epoxy paints.  Over 9,300 m of plywood was used to build the roof.
 Chatelaine Magazine House
 Economic Progress Pavilion
 Christian Pavilion
 European Community Pavilion
 Hospitality Pavilion

 Indians of Canada - A pavilion devoted to the Indigenous people of Canada.  It was one of the most controversial buildings as it included photos and works of art that depicted the difficulties faced by Indigenous people in Canada (such as on reserves, and issues raised with the use of Residential schools).  It showcased the plight of Indigenous people before and after the arrival of European settlers, and explained at length how those European settlers needed the aid of Indigenous people in order to survive the harsh winters in Canada.
 Judaism Pavilion
 Kaleidoscope Pavilion
 Kodak Pavilion
 OEDC Pavilion
 Olympic House
 Place des Nations
 Polymer Pavilion
 Sermons from Science Pavilion
 United Nations Pavilion

Provincial and state pavilions 
 Atlantic Provinces: Nova Scotia, New Brunswick, Prince Edward Island and Newfoundland shared the same pavilion building. 
 Maine
 New York State

 Ontario: The fabric-roofed pavilion contained 16 bilingual exhibits, a 570-seat circular theatre with a  screen which played the 17-minute film A Place to Stand, which premiered the highly influential multi-dynamic image technique, and a large restaurant complex. The movie included the song "A Place to Stand, A Place to Grow", which became the unofficial theme song for the province. It was designed by Macy DuBois, who also worked with landscape architect Dick Strong on pavilion landscaping, featuring massive granite blocks. 
 Quebec, designed by Papineau, Gérin-Lajoie, Le Blanc and Durand, architectes.
 Vermont
 Western Provinces: Alberta, British Columbia, Manitoba, and Saskatchewan  all shared the same building space.

See also 

 Expo 67 (opening week)
 List of world's fairs
 Montreal Expo Express, a mass transit rail system built exclusively to service Expo 67, running from Place d'Accueil on Cité du Havre to Île Notre-Dame.
 A Place to Stand, A Place to Grow
 A Centennial Song
 1967 in Canada
 1976 Summer Olympics, also held in Montreal, using part of the Expo 67 site.
 Expo '86, held in Vancouver
 Ontario Place, a Toronto park created in the 1970s to mimic Expo 67.
 Canadian National Exhibition and the Pacific National Exhibition, held annually

References 
Notes

Bibliography

External links

Multimedia 
 CBC Digital Archives - Expo 67: Montreal Welcomes the World
 Expo 67 - A Virtual Experience , from the website of Library and Archives Canada
 Historica Minutes TV Commercial Canadian Heritage

Other websites 
 Overview of Expo 67 pavilions by author Jeffrey Stanton
 "THE" site on the Expo 67 A lot of documentation and a slideshow with over 70 photos
 Expo 67 - In pictures, from the website of SORELLARIUM : 13
 Expo 67 in Montreal
 Expo 67 postcard gallery
 Expo 67 in photos - www.worldsfairphotos.com
 Usage of wood at Expo 67
 The Films of Expo 67, from Time magazine
 Canadian Film Encyclopedia: Films at Expo 67
 

Buildings and structures completed in 1967
Buildings and structures in Montreal
Expo 67
Modernist architecture in Canada
World's fair architecture in Montreal